General elections were held in India on 20 May, 12 June and 15 June 1991 to elect the members of the 10th Lok Sabha, although they were delayed until 19 February 1992 in Punjab.

No party could muster a majority in the Lok Sabha, resulting in the Indian National Congress forming a minority government under new Prime Minister P. V. Narasimha Rao with the support of other parties.

Elections were not held in 2 seats in Bihar and 1 seat in Uttar Pradesh. Elections were not held for the six seats allocated to Jammu and Kashmir, nor for two seats in Bihar and one in Uttar Pradesh. Voter turnout was the lowest to date in an Indian general election.

Background
The 1991 elections were held as the previous Lok Sabha, with Chandra Sekhar at its helm had been dissolved just 16 months after government formation. Over 500 million eligible voters were once again given the chance to elect their government. The elections were held in a polarised environment and are also referred to as the 'Mandal-Mandir' elections after the two most important poll issues, the Mandal Commission fallout and the Ram Janmabhoomi-Babri Masjid issue.

Mandal-Mandir Issue
While the Mandal Commission report implemented by the VP Singh government gave 27 per cent reservation to the Other Backward Castes (OBCs) in government jobs, it led to widespread violence and protests across the country, with many students in and around Delhi even setting themselves on fire. Mandir represented the hallmark of this election, where there was a debate over the disputed Babri Masjid structure at Ayodhya, which the Bharatiya Janata Party was using as its major election manifesto.

The Mandir issue led to numerous riots in many parts of the country and the electorate was polarised on caste and religious lines. With the National Front falling apart, the Congress managed to make the most of the polarisation, by getting the most seats and forming a minority government.

Rajiv Gandhi Assassination

A day after the first round of polling took place on 20 May, former prime minister Rajiv Gandhi was assassinated while campaigning for Margatham Chandrasekar at Sriperembudur. The remaining election days were postponed until mid-June and voting finally took place on 12 and 15 June. Voting was the lowest ever in parliamentary elections with just 53 per cent of the electorate exercising their right to vote.

Since the assassination took place after first phase of polling in 211 of 534 constituencies and the balance constituencies went to polls after the assassination, the 1991 results varied greatly between phases. Congress was almost wiped out in the first phase, and rode a massive sympathy wave to sweep the second phase. The end result was a Congress-led minority government led by P. V. Narasimha Rao, who had previously announced his retirement from politics. While P.V. Narsimha Rao had not contested in the election , he contested in a by-election in Nandyal which he won by a record five lakh votes.

Jammu & Kashmir, Punjab 
76 to 126 people were shot dead during campaign on 17 June 1991 in two attacks by gunmen in Punjab, an area racked by separatist violence. Police reports said the killings, on separate trains, were carried out by Sikh militants. No elections were held in Jammu and Kashmir and Punjab, a total of 19 Lok Sabha seats. Elections were held in Punjab on 19 February 1992, where INC won 12 out of 13 seats, thereby taking their tally in the Lok Sabha up from 232 to 244.

Results

Delayed elections in Punjab

Aftermath
Congress was in a position to form government. The persons, mentioned in media, as probable Prime Minister, were:
 Former Home, and Foreign minister P. V. Narasimha Rao.
 Chief Minister of Maharashtra Sharad Pawar.
 Former Chief Minister of Madhya Pradesh Arjun Singh.
 Former Finance, and Foreign minister N. D. Tiwari.

Congress eventually formed the government under the Prime Ministership of P. V. Narasimha Rao. After Lal Bahadur Shastri, Rao was the second Congress Prime Minister from outside the Nehru-Gandhi family and the first Congress Prime Minister to head a minority government that completed full 5-year term. He introduced Economic reforms in India.

See also
Election Commission of India
1989 Indian general election

References

 
May 1991 events in Asia
June 1991 events in Asia
India
General elections in India